This is a list of Greek football transfers winter 2022–23.

Greek Super League

AEK Athens

In:

Out:

Aris Thessaloniki

In:

Out:

Asteras Tripolis

In:

Out:

Atromitos

In:

Out:

Ionikos

In:

Out:

Lamia

In:

Out:

Levadiakos

In:
 

Out:

OFI

In:

Out:

Olympiacos

In:

Out:

Panathinaikos

In:

Out:

Panetolikos

In:

Out:

PAOK

In:
 

Out:

PAS Giannina

 
In:
 

Out:

Volos

 
In:
 

Out:

Super League Greece 2

AEK Athens B

In:

Out:

AEL Larissa

In:

Out:

Apollon Pontus F.C.

In:

Out:

Anagennisi Karditsa F.C.

In:

Out:

Apollon Smyrnis

In:

Out:

Chania FC

In:

Out:

Egaleo F.C.

In:

Out:

Ierapetra 

In:

Out:

Irodotos FC 

In:

Out:

Olympiacos B

In:

Out:

Panserraikos F.C.

In:

Out:

References

Greece
Transfers
2022-23